Cathy Basrak (born 1977) is an American violist. She is the Assistant Principal Violist of the Boston Symphony Orchestra and gave the premiere of the John Williams' viola concerto. She previously won several important viola competitions such as the 1995 Primrose International Viola Competition, Irving M. Klein Competition, and others. Basrak studied with Michael Tree, Joseph de Pasquale, and Roland and Almita Vamos.

External links
Cathy Basrak
Art of the States: Cathy Basrak

1977 births
Living people
American classical violists
Women violists
Place of birth missing (living people)
Cedille Records artists